The American Bank Center is an entertainment complex located in Corpus Christi, Texas. The complex consists of an auditorium, convention center and arena. The facility hosts numerous conventions, trade shows, exhibitions, live performances and sporting events. It is home to the Corpus Christi IceRays Tier II Jr. A ice hockey team and the Texas A&M–Corpus Christi Islanders men's and women's NCAA basketball teams. It is owned by the city of Corpus Christi and managed by ASM Global.

In 2007, the arena was the site for a controversial event in the WWE. The same day as the scheduled Monday Night Raw taping, professional wrestler Chris Benoit along with his wife and son were found dead, with the promotion running a tribute show while being unaware of the horrific circumstances surrounding the deaths until the show almost ended. EliteXC: Renegade was held at the arena in 2007 and WEC 39 in 2009. 

On July 19, 2011, Barney, Baby Bop, BJ, and Riff, performed here during Barney Live in Concert - Birthday Bash! which was supposed to be filmed here and released on DVD, but it was never made. 

On May 31, 2015, WWE hosted that year's edition of their Elimination Chamber pay-per-view event. In 2019, the arena hosted the December 18 episode of AEW Dynamite.

Facilities

American Bank Center Arena
The American Bank Center Arena is an indoor arena located adjacent to the American Bank Center Convention Center. The construction of the arena was a joint effort by Thompson Ventulett Stainback & Associates, Arquitectonica and Gignac & Associates. The venue broke ground on November 3, 2002, and was completed in October 2004. Unique to the area is its split-tiered seating system design. This allows the large venue to have the illusion of a theatre setting. The maximum capacity of the arena is 10,000 for sporting events and concerts. The cost of the project was over $49 million.

Selena Auditorium
The Selena Auditorium opened in 1979, then known as the Bayfront Plaza Auditorium. The venue was the filming location of the Johnny Canales Show. In 1996, the venue was renamed in commemoration of notable resident, Tejano musician Selena Quintanilla-Pérez, whose memorial and public viewing were held at the venue the previous year. It was renovated in 2004 to connect the property to the other buildings in the complex. The maximum capacity is 2,500. The venue is noted for its acoustics and for being "one of the most attended venues for entertainment in the Texas Coastal Bend area".

American Bank Center Convention Center
First opened in 1980 as the Bayfront Plaza Convention Center, it underwent renovation and was renamed American Bank Center Convention Center in November 2004. The convention center consists of five exhibits halls, two ballrooms and 21 meeting rooms. The main ballroom is called the Henry Garrett Ballroom. The South Texas Oilfield Expo was one of the largest patrons of the convention center in 2012.

See also
 List of NCAA Division I basketball arenas

References

American Bank Center
Date when arena opened
American Bank Center requires bigger deposit than originally thought

1967 establishments in Texas
Indoor ice hockey venues in the United States
Basketball venues in Texas
Indoor arenas in Texas
Mixed martial arts venues in Texas
Sports venues completed in 1967
Sports venues in Corpus Christi, Texas
Texas A&M–Corpus Christi Islanders men's basketball